The United Cook Islanders was a political party in the Cook Islands.  It was established on 16 February 1968 in order to challenge the then-dominant Cook Islands Party and provide a more organised opposition.  The party was organised by David Hosking and Taira Rere.  Prominent members included former CIP cabinet ministers Manea Tamarua and Mana Strickland.  The party did not initially have a formal leader, though Hosking served as "campaign leader"

At the 1968 election, the party ran on a platform of economic development, increased pensions, and good governance.  It promised to end the autocratic style of government practiced by the CIP's Albert Henry, end family and party appointments to the public service, and ensure public service neutrality.  The party won six seats, becoming  the parliamentary opposition.

Leaders
Ngatupuna Matepi (1968–1969)
Tangaroa Tangaroa (1969–1970)
Vainerere Tangatapoto (1970–1971)

References

Defunct political parties in the Cook Islands
Political parties established in 1968